Thamnasteriidae is a family of stony corals which became extinct in the Mesozoic.

References

External links

Scleractinia
Cnidarian families